In enzymology, a luteolin 7-O-glucuronosyltransferase is an enzyme that catalyzes the chemical reaction

UDP-glucuronate + luteolin  UDP + luteolin 7-O-beta-D-glucuronide

Thus, the two substrates of this enzyme are UDP-glucuronate and luteolin, whereas its two products are UDP and luteolin 7-O-beta-D-glucuronide.

This enzyme belongs to the family of glycosyltransferases, specifically the hexosyltransferases.  The systematic name of this enzyme class is UDP-glucuronate:luteolin 7-O-glucuronosyltransferase. Other names in common use include uridine diphosphoglucuronate-luteolin 7-O-glucuronosyltransferase, and LGT.

References

 

EC 2.4.1
Enzymes of unknown structure